WRBY-LP is a Haitian Creole community formatted broadcast radio station licensed to and serving Salisbury, Maryland.  WRBY-LP is owned and operated by Rebirth, Inc.

See also
Haitian Americans
History of the Haitians in Salisbury, Maryland

References

External links
 Radio Oasis 100.5 Online
 

2015 establishments in Maryland
RBY-LP
Haitian-American culture in Maryland
Haitian Creole-language mass media
RBY-LP
Radio stations established in 2015
Christian radio stations in Maryland
Salisbury, Maryland